Steven Sam Staryk, OC (born 27 April 1932) is a Canadian violin virtuoso.

Biography
Born in Toronto, Ontario, Canada of Ukrainian descent, began his musical education at 7 years old at the Harbord Collegiate Institute. He pursued further violin  studies with Albert Pratz at The Royal Conservatory of Music (Toronto) and in New York City.

As a renowned teacher, orchestral and chamber musician, and international soloist, he is considered to be the leading Canadian-born violinist of his generation. He is listed in The Encyclopedia of Music in Canada and 23 international publications including The New Grove Dictionary of Music and Musicians. Awards include the Shevchenko Medal, the Queen's Silver Jubilee Medal, an honorary doctorate of letters from Toronto's York University, and arts awards from the Canada Council.

In 1951, he was one of the Symphony Six who were denied permission to enter the United States.

He was runner-up to Salvatore Accardo in the International Competition for Musical Performers in Geneva, 1956. No first prize was awarded that year.

Again, he was runner-up at the Carl Flesch International Competition in London where only one prize is awarded.

He became concertmaster of the Royal Philharmonic Orchestra at the age of 24, the youngest ever, earning the title "king of concertmasters" from The Strad magazine. He went on to serve as concertmaster of the Concertgebouw, Amsterdam Chamber Orchestra, the Chicago Symphony Orchestra, and the Toronto Symphony Orchestra.

Staryk is a well known master teacher and many of his pupils hold various positions in major orchestras, chamber groups and professional music schools around the world. He has taught at the Amsterdam Conservatory, Northwestern University and the American Conservatory in Chicago. He became the youngest full professor at Oberlin College Conservatory in Ohio. He served as head of the string department at the Vancouver Academy of Music and taught at the University of Victoria. Other teaching posts include the University of Ottawa, the University of Western Ontario, The Royal Conservatory of Music (Toronto), and the University of Toronto. His teaching career culminated with the University of Washington in Seattle which conferred on him its Distinguished Teaching Award, the first ever accorded to a Professor in its School of Music. Among his notable students are violinist Lenny Solomon and composer Marc Sabat.

He was a member of the Oberlin String Quartet, a founding member of Quartet Canada, led the CBC String Quartet and formed the Staryk-Perry Duo (with pianist John Perry).

Staryk served as the first Canadian adjudicator for the Tchaikovsky Competition in Moscow in 1982.

His discography of over 190 compositions ranks him as one of the most prolific recording violinists on the world stage and the most recorded classical Canadian musician to date. (James Creighton: Discography of the Violin)

In 1987, Staryk appeared as the adult composer/violinist in the two-hour docu-drama film Vivaldi.

In 2000 he co-authored a book with Thane Lewis about his life as a professional musician in  Fiddling With Life: The Unusual Journey of Steven Staryk.

The prestigious Gramophone of London provides a succinct summary: "Staryk is among the great ones."

In 2007 he was made an Officer of the Order of Canada and in 2008 received an Honorary Fellowship from the Glenn Gould School of The Royal Conservatory of Music (Toronto).

As of March 2009, Staryk has started distribution of his recently completed 30-CD anthology of his performances from 1952 to 2003.

References

External links 
 

1932 births
Living people
Canadian classical violinists
Male classical violinists
Musicians from Toronto
Canadian people of Ukrainian descent
Officers of the Order of Canada
Fellows of the Royal Conservatory of Music
The Royal Conservatory of Music alumni
Academic staff of the Vancouver Academy of Music
Players of the Royal Concertgebouw Orchestra
Academic staff of the University of Western Ontario
Academic staff of the University of Ottawa
University of Washington faculty
Academic staff of the University of Toronto
21st-century classical violinists
20th-century Canadian violinists and fiddlers
21st-century Canadian violinists and fiddlers
Canadian male violinists and fiddlers
Centaur Records artists